Shapeshifter (sometimes referred to as New Zealand Shapeshifter) are a live drum and bass act from New Zealand. They are known for their live shows and blend of heavy soul with drum and bass. They have made appearances at Glastonbury, The Big Chill, Big Day Out, Parklife plus sold-out performances across Europe, Australia and New Zealand.

History and biography
Shapeshifter formed in 1999 after the four founding members met at jazz school. They had a range of musical backgrounds ranging from dub, jazz, and hip-hop, to metal, funk and electronica. As a result, they decided to bring these influences together to create live drum & bass. After playing locally, they released an early EP entitled D.N.A.

In 2001, Shapeshifter released their debut LP entitled Realtime. The album included a collaboration with vocalist Ladi6 on the track "Move With Me" as well as Kaps (Fabel) and Tiki (Salmonella Dub) on production. Realtime was awarded the 'Best Electronic Release' title at the 2002 bNet NZ Music Awards, and was also nominated at the RIANZ NZ Music Awards for 'Best Electronic Album'.

In 2002, Shapeshifter relocated to Melbourne. They toured extensively, performing at events such as the 4ZZZ Market Day Festival in Brisbane, the Bellingen Global Carnival, and sold-out shows in Sydney, Melbourne and Byron Bay.

In late-2003, vocalist Paora Apera (aka P Digsss) joined Shapeshifter's live line-up. The new line-up was road tested on Salmonella Dub's One Drop East album release tour of Australia in August/September. Shapeshifter played 12 shows in various cities to an overwhelming crowd response. Other highlights included their first tour of Europe at locations including London, Edinburgh and Rotterdam.

In 2004, Shapeshifter then released their second album Riddim Wise. This was their step towards a more atmospheric style of drum and bass. Recorded at the group's own home studio in Melbourne, the album features collaborations with Aotearoa vocalists Dallas Tamaira aka Joe Dukie (Fat Freddy's Drop), Karoline Tamati aka Lady 6 (Verse 2/Sheelahroc) and Paora Apera aka P Digsss. The album was praised as a steady progression from 'Realtime', with an emphasis on funky dancefloor grooves, whilst maintaining strong musical elements. The album became the #1 Independent NZ album release and also the #1 NZ National Dance Album in New Zealand history.

The band's third album Soulstice was released in August 2006, with lead single "Bring Change" receiving extensive video and radio play. The album takes influences from soul, reggae, funk, rock, and drum 'n' bass. Soulstice obtained Gold sales status in New Zealand in three weeks and has since achieved Platinum sales. September 2006 saw Shapeshifter tour throughout New Zealand, performing with leading orchestras and selling out their shows weeks in advance. In 2007, Shapeshifter released a live album entitled Shapeshifter Live which was recorded on 29 September 2006 at the Christchurch Town Hall – the final show of their orchestra tour and in the band's hometown. This 6-track album contained a previously unreleased song called "Good Looking" and appeared alongside other popular Shapeshifter tracks such as "Tapestry", "Bring Change" and "One".

In 2008, Shapeshifter embarked on their fourth European tour playing sold-out dates in Paris, Rotterdam, Amsterdam, Scotland and England. The tour also promoted their single "One", released in May 2008, and off the back of the tour and single, the decision was made to release Soulstice' in the UK and Europe. This was released on 17 November on Mums The Word Records with a special re-designed package that includes new artwork and exclusive remixes from D-Bridge (Exit Records), Nu:Tone and The Nextmen. Shapeshifter also toured Australia at the end of 2008 and during their summer tour of New Zealand, they played new unreleased tracks including "Dutch Sorrow", "Right Here, Right Now", "Day One", "Twin Galaxies", "Warning" and "System" some of which appeared on their next album entitled, The System Is A Vampire, released 12 November 2009. Shapeshifter also released a remix EP in late 2008 featuring two alternative versions of their song "Bring Change" by themselves and fellow New Zealand drum and bass artists, The Upbeats. A remix of their song "Long White Cloud" was also included, remixed by Nu:Tone. Shapeshifter also released a remix of their hit tune, Electric Dream which was remixed by New Zealand drum and bass act, State of Mind.

Shapeshifter also have their own recording label called Truetone Recordings. Their first album, Realtime, and early EPs were released under Kog Transmissions.

November 2009 saw the release of the band's fourth studio album entitled The System Is A Vampire with lead single "Dutchies". The album was shortlisted for the inaugural Taite Music Prize in 2010. In September 2009 during a tour of Australia, drummer Redford Grenell left the band. He was replaced by drummer and producer Johnny Hooves. P. Digsss stated that Mr. Grenell had told the band that he had "come to the end of his road" with Shapeshifter. In 2013, Johnny Hooves left the band and was replaced by Wellington drummer Darren Mathiassen.

The band embarked on a summer tour throughout New Zealand in December 2009/January 2010. They played at Coromandel Gold in front of 10,000 people to welcome in the new year. They repeated this concert in the summer of 2011.

In July 2010, Shapeshifter were signed by UK Drum and Bass label Hospital Records, who released Shapeshifter's platinum-selling album The System is a Vampire globally. They also released a new collection of remixes in October 2010 entitled 'The System is a Remix'. It features a range of Shapeshifter remixed tunes from Logistics, Camo & Krooked, Netsky, State of Mind and The Upbeats.

The band is known in the UK and Europe as "New Zealand Shapeshifter" in order to differentiate themselves from popular house act "The Shapeshifters".

In 2013, Shapeshifter released their 5th studio album titled "Delta" which includes lead singles Monarch, Diamond Trade and Gravity. It was recorded in Berlin, Germany and Wellington, New Zealand and was released on 31 May followed by a NZ wide tour. The album has been mixed by NZ drum and bass producers The Upbeats.

In 2014, founding member of 15 years Devin Abrams left the band and was replaced by Dan McGruer.

In July 2016, Shapeshifter released a new single, "Stars", from their new album to rave reviews "The title track of the album is also the first song on the album and instantly draws the listener in with its etheric, carnival type atmosphere. It is a summer anthem song and over my travels this summer it is definitely a song I have heard multiple times from cars with their windows down and occupants singing along having the time of their life".

In 2018, NZ Prime Minister Jacinda Ardern gifted Shapeshifter's The System Is A Vampire CD and a Stars vinyl to Prince Harry and Meghan, the Duchess of Sussex, during their royal tour of the South Pacific.

Side projects
Vocalist P.Digss is part of The Sunshine Soundsystem, who play around New Zealand with a hip-hop, funk, dancehall, reggae and jungle flavour. They regularly play the Kaikoura Roots Festival, Rippon Festival, Destination and have supported acts such as The Nextmen, Aphrodite and London Elektricity.

Nick Robinson DJs under the name "Nicky Research" and Sam Trevethick DJs under the name "Sambora".

P-Digsss, Sambora and Nicky Research perform together as "The Peacekeepers".

Shapeshifter also has a close working relationship with ex-Salmonella Dub front man Tiki Taane. Upon the release of Taane's debut solo album, Past, Present, Future, in 2008, Members of Shapeshifter were asked to tour with Taane in his live band "The Dub Soldiers" to help promote the new album. Tiki Taane is also Shapeshifter's sound technician during their live shows.
  
In 2014, Shapeshifter collaborated with another New Zealand drum and bass group known as The Upbeats to produce an EP album, combining two entirely different styles of DnB.

Band members

Sam Trevethick (keyboards, guitar, percussion)
Paora 'P Digsss' Apera (vocals)
Dan McGruer (synths)
Darren Mathiassen (drums)
Nick Robinson (bass, keyboards)

Discography

Albums

Singles

Featured appearances
The group have appeared on many compilations and soundtracks since 2001 in New Zealand. The following is a list of these albums that have featured tracks by Shapeshifter.

 2001 - The Gathering 3: Unity Through Diversity (Virgin) - DNA
 2002 - The Gathering Aotearoa 2002 (Loop) - Tapestry
 2002 - Heads Up!!! Music From The 2002 bNet Music Awards (Festival Mushroom) - Move With Me featuring Ladi6
 2002 - In 2 Deep (Fabel Music) - Move With Me (Remix)
 2002 - Loop. Select 003 (Loop Recordings Aot(ear)oa) - Move With Me featuring Ladi6
 2005 - Dub Conspiracy - "Tapestry"
 2005 - Kaikoura Roots Festival 2005 - Been Missin and Ganja Love
 2007 - Nuclear Free Nation (Motu Karihi Kau) (CD/DVD) - Bring Change
 2019 - Waiata / Anthems - Ngā Kano / In Colour

Awards
Shapeshifter have enjoyed many awards and nominations at the publicly voted bNet NZ Music Awards, held annually And also the Vodafone New Zealand Music awards (Tui Awards)

2000 - Winner of the Best New Act
2001 - Nominated for Best Live Act and Best Electronic Release (D.N.A. EP)
2002 - Winner of the Best Electronic Release (Realtime)
2002 - Nominated for Best Song (Tapestry) and Best Album (Realtime)
2003 - Showcase performance at awards ceremony
2006 - Winner of Best Album(Soulstice) Best Song (Bring Change)and Best Live Act
2007 - Tui Award winner for Best Electronic Release (Soulstice) and Best Live Act
2013 - Tui Award winner for Best Electronic Album (Delta) and Best Live act.
2015 - Nominated for Best Electronic Album (Shapeshifter & The Upbeats - SSXUB) 
2016 - Nominated for Single of the Year (Stars), with showcase performance at the Awards ceremony
2016 - Nominated for Best Group
2017 - Nominated for Artisan Awards: NZ On Air Best Music Video (Her) and Best Album Cover (Stars)
2021 - Nominated for Best Group and Best Electronic Artist (Rituals)

In 2005, Shapeshifter's video for Long White Cloud, Directed by Ash Bolland won Best Electronic Release at the Juice TV Awards.

Notes

References

External links

AudioCulture profile

Drum and bass music groups
New Zealand electronic music groups
Musical groups established in 1999
1999 establishments in New Zealand